Crataerina melbae is a species of biting fly in the family of louse flies Hippoboscidae. Its hosts are swift species including the Alpine, Pacific, Common and mottled swifts.

Crataerina melbae was shown to contain symbiotic bacterium Sodalis.

References

External links 

Parasitic flies
Parasites of birds
Hippoboscidae
Insects described in 1879
Taxa named by Camillo Rondani